Ride Gwinnett (formerly known as Gwinnett County Transit or GCT prior to 2023) is the bus public transit system in Gwinnett County, Georgia, United States, one of metro Atlanta's three most populous suburban counties. (The others are Cobb County, which operates CobbLinc, and Clayton County, which formerly operated Clayton County C-TRAN.)

It was formed in 2000, with express buses starting in November 2001 and local buses in November 2002, and has had greater-than-expected ridership since then. Routes connect to the most populated areas of the county, including Norcross and Lawrenceville. With the assistance of the Georgia Regional Transportation Authority (GRTA), express services are available to Atlanta, connecting with MARTA at the Doraville (NE10), Arts Center (N5), Midtown (N4), North Avenue (N3), Civic Center (N2), Peachtree Center (N1), and Five Points stations. Transfers are free between MARTA and GCT. On December 10, 2008, GCT began the official Breeze Card Pilot Launch on routes 10, 102, and 103A.

Along with Cobb, Gwinnett voted against MARTA in 1971 and thus was left out of a system. The lack of sales tax revenue from the two counties stunted the growth of MARTA; however, GRTA, created by former Governor of Georgia Roy Barnes, has been seeking to create other solutions, such as transit for the entire Atlanta and surrounding areas. The Gwinnett Place Community Improvement District (GPCID) along with MARTA are seeking alternative, such as light rail to Gwinnett through the Gwinnett Place area.

In 2016, Gwinnett County Transit started a new express route, 110 that serviced the Indian Trail Park and Ride area to the Emory/CDC employment center.  Some service was expanded to Sugarloaf Park and Ride Lot in May 2017.

Gwinnett County Transit has 5 local bus routes. The Gwinnett Place Mall Transit Center Hub houses the transfer point for local routes; 10, 30, and 40. Gwinnett County Transit has 5 express bus routes. The express routes are 101, 102, 103, and 110. There is also a reverse commute route 103A, which are used by reverse commuters on the AM and PM trips.

Recent news reports have documented a pattern and practice of overcharging some patrons of the GRTA Xpress bus routes when using Breeze cards to pay transit fares. GRTA has acknowledged the issue in a few printed handbills advising patrons to purchase multiple Breeze cards (one for each type of bus or rail fare) to pay transit fares and record transfers between the GRTA, CobbLinc, and MARTA transit systems.

In September 2018, MARTA’s Board of Directors and the Gwinnett County Board of Commissioners gave conditional approval to an agreement which would see MARTA acquire GCT, significantly expand bus service in the county and clear the way for a long-sought-after extension of MARTA’s rail system into the county from its current terminus at Doraville. The contract with MARTA would go into effect only if a public vote, scheduled for March 2019, succeeds. The agreement calls for a new one-cent sales tax that would be collected in Gwinnett County until 2057.
The transit referendum failed on March 19, 2019.

In January 2023, Gwinnett County Transit officially changed its name to Ride Gwinnett.

Routes

Local
10: Sugarloaf Mills (formerly Discover Mills) Mall to Gwinnett Place Mall to MARTA Doraville station via portions of Buford Highway, Beaver Ruin Road, and Satellite Blvd. Route runs about every 30 minutes, with 15 minute  frequency in the early mornings and late afternoons.
20: North Norcross-Tucker Road to Tech Drive via McDonough Drive, South Norcross-Tucker Road and Singleton Road, with frequency 30 minute peak and 60 minute off peak. No service to Gwinnett Transit Center but connects to MARTA at Doraville.   
30: Connecting Duluth to Lilburn via South Berkely Road to Gwinnett Transit Center via Indian Trail - Lilburn Road. This portion is one-way only and is known as the "Lilburn Loop." It runs Burns to Pleasant Hill to Lawrenceville Highway to Rockbridge to Dickens back to Indian Trail-Lilburn Road. Frequency is 30 minutes peak to 60 minutes off peak.
35: Technology Parkway and Spalding to Buford Highway and North Norcross-Tucker Rd. No service to Gwinnett Transit Center. Frequency is hourly. It goes from the Forum on Peachtree Parkway to the MARTA Doraville Station. Frequency is 30 minutes peak to 60 minutes off peak.
40: Connecting Gwinnett Place Transit Center to the City of Lawrenceville via Old Norcross Rd. Atkison Road "Gwinnett Tech" through Old Norcross and Historic Downtown Lawrenceville and through portions which are only One-Way Sugarloaf Parkway. Frequency is 30 minutes peak to 60 minutes off peak.

Express
101: I-985 @ Buford Drive Park & Ride to Downtown 
102: Indian Trail Park & Ride to Downtown 
103: Sugarloaf Mills-North Brown Park & Ride to Downtown 
103A: AM: Georgia State Capitol to Midtown, ending at Sugarloaf Mills Park & Ride via Steve Reynolds Boulevard, Breckingridge Road, and North Brown.PM: Sugarloaf Mills via Steve Reynolds Boulevard, Breckinridge Road, and North Brown to Midtown ending at the Georgia State Capitol
110: Indian Trail & Sugarloaf Park and Ride to CDC/Emory

Planned route expansions and changes by fiscal year 2024 

 10: Gwinnett Place Transit Center to Doraville Station via Buford Highway & Satellite Boulevard
 15: Peachtree Corners to Lilburn
 20: Gwinnett Place Transit Center to Doraville Station via Singleton Road & Steve Reynolds Boulevard
 25: Gwinnett Place Transit Center to Duluth
 30: Lilburn to Doraville Station
 35A: Peachtree Corners to Doraville Station via Technology Parkway
 35B: Peachtree Corners to Doraville Station via Medlock Bridge Road
 40: Gwinnett Place Transit Center to Lawrenceville East
 45: Gwinnett Place Transit Center to Georgia Gwinnett College/Lawrenceville East via Sugarloaf Mills Park & Ride
 50: Gwinnett Place Transit Center to Mall of Georgia 
 60: South Lawrenceville to Snellville
 70: Snellville to Indian Creek Transit Station
 104: Harbins Mill Park & Ride to Downtown Atlanta

Source

References

External links 
GCT website

Bus transportation in Georgia (U.S. state)
Transportation in Gwinnett County, Georgia